Khera Bet  is a village in Kapurthala district of Punjab State, India. The village is administrated by a Sarpanch, who is an elected representative.

Demography 
According to the report published by Census India in 2011, Khera Bet had a total number of 138 houses and population of 723 which included 391 males and 332 females. Literacy rate of Khera Bet is 78.60%, higher than state average of 75.84%.  The population of children under the age of 6 years is 64 which is 8.85% of total population of Khera Bet, and child sex ratio is approximately 684, lower than the state average of 846.

Population data

Air travel connectivity 
The closest airport to the village is Sri Guru Ram Dass Jee International Airport.

Villages in Kapurthala

References

External links
  Villages in Kapurthala
 Kapurthala Villages List

Villages in Kapurthala district